Please Believe Me is a 1950 American romantic comedy film directed by Norman Taurog, and starring Deborah Kerr, Robert Walker, Mark Stevens and Peter Lawford.

Plot
Alison Kirbe is a young London girl who has just found out she has inherited a Texas ranch from an old soldier she had befriended during World War II. Mistakenly assuming she is now the owner of a small empire, she crosses the Atlantic Ocean by ship. On her way, she meets Terence Keath, a fellow passenger heavily in debt to casino owner Lucky Reilly. To pay off his debts, he attempts to marry rich and starts to seduce Alison, as he thinks she is a wealthy heiress. Another person who is attracted to Alison is Jeremy Taylor, a millionaire bachelor who is accompanied by his attorney Matthew Kinston.

The following days she enjoys the attention she is receiving from Terence, Jeremy and Matthew, but rejects them all. She feels most attracted to Matthew, but he mistakenly confronts her for being part of a scheme. Trying to hurt Matthew, she borrows money from Terence and buys an expensive present for Jeremy, while posing as a wealthy heiress. After arriving in America, Alison decides to stay in New York for a week before traveling to Texas. Matthew, meanwhile, tries to find more information on the ranch she has inherited, which makes him suspect her of scheming Jeremy all the more.

Matthew confronts Alison at a casino, where she is gambling with Terence and Jeremy. He soon apologizes, however, and they kiss not much later. Terence and Jeremy, who are witnesses of the kiss, are shocked that she prefers a pennyless attorney over them. The next day, Matthew finds out Alison's ranch is not worth anything and accuses her again of swindling Jeremy. Alison bursts out in tears, angry at Matthew for turning an honest and good-hearted inheritance into a supposed scheme. That night, Alison finds out about Terence's financial situation and tries to help him out by offering Reilly to pay off Terence's debts.

It proves unnecessary, though, as Jeremy is prepared to pay for the entire debt. Afterwards, the three men rush to the hotel, where they propose to Alison all at the same time. Alison enthusiastically accepts Matthew's proposal and the other men soon move on, hitting on other women only moments later.

Cast
 Deborah Kerr as Alison Kirbe
 Robert Walker as Terence Keath
 Mark Stevens as Matthew Kinston
 Peter Lawford as Jeremy Taylor
 James Whitmore as Vincent Maran
 J. Carrol Naish as 'Lucky' Reilly
 Spring Byington as Mrs. Milwright
 Drue Mallory as Beryl Robinson 
 Carol Savage as Sylvia Rumley

Production
On May 29, 1949, it was announced Norman Taurog was set to direct the film. By that time, Deborah Kerr, Robert Walker and Peter Lawford were already cast. On June 14, 1949, Van Johnson was assigned in the remaining male lead, with shooting beginning a month later. Filming started with Johnson, but he was replaced by Mark Stevens in August 1949.

The film was Val Lewton's first and only film for Metro-Goldwyn-Mayer. MGM was so satisfied with the script, that they offered to raise the budget and replace Kerr with June Allyson, who was more famous by that time. Lewton insisted on keeping Kerr, however.

Reception
According to MGM records, the film only earned $577,000 in the US and Canada and $192,000 overseas, resulting in a loss of $609,000.

References

External links
 
 
 
 

1950 films
1950 romantic comedy films
American black-and-white films
American romantic comedy films
1950s English-language films
Films directed by Norman Taurog
Films produced by Val Lewton
Metro-Goldwyn-Mayer films
Films set in London
Films scored by Hans J. Salter
1950s American films